Argyroxiphium caliginis, the Eke silversword, is a species of flowering plant in the family Asteraceae.

It is found only in two Hawaiian tropical rainforest bogs in West Maui, Hawaii.

The species is threatened by damage to the bogs by rooting feral pigs, but the main population at Eke Crater is now protected by fencing.

See also
Silversword alliance

References

External links

caliginis
Endemic flora of Hawaii
Biota of Maui
Taxonomy articles created by Polbot